Mandres may refer to several places in Europe:

In France
Mandres, Eure, in the Eure department
Mandres-aux-Quatre-Tours in the Meurthe-et-Moselle department
Mandres-en-Barrois in the Meuse department
Mandres-la-Côte in the Haute-Marne department
Mandres-les-Roses in the Val-de-Marne department
Mandres-sur-Vair in the Vosges department

In Greece

Mandres, Kilkis, a village in the Kilkis regional unit

In Cyprus

Mandres, Cyprus, a village located north of Nicosia
Mandres, Famagusta, a village located in  Famagusta District